Love in Exile is a 1936 British romantic adventure film directed by Alfred L. Werker and starring Helen Vinson, Clive Brook and Mary Carlisle.

Production
The film was shot at Isleworth Studios in west London by the independent producer Max Schach. It was based on the novel His Majesty's Pajamas by Gene Markey. The film's art direction was by John Mead.

Cast
 Helen Vinson as Countess Xandra St. Aurion
 Clive Brook as King Regis VI
 Mary Carlisle as Emily Stewart
 Ronald Squire as Paul
 Cecil Ramage as John Weston
 Will Fyffe as Doc Tate
 Tamara Desni as Tanya
 Edmund Breon as Baron Zarroy
 Henry Oscar as Dictator  
 Barbara Everest as Anna

References

Bibliography
Low, Rachael. Filmmaking in 1930s Britain. George Allen & Unwin, 1985.
Wood, Linda. British Films, 1927–1939. British Film Institute, 1986.

External links

1936 films
1936 romantic drama films
British black-and-white films
British romantic drama films
Films directed by Alfred L. Werker
Films based on American novels
Films scored by Benjamin Frankel
Films shot at Isleworth Studios
Films with screenplays by Herman J. Mankiewicz
1930s English-language films
1930s British films